"Treceți, batalioane române, Carpații" is a Romanian patriotic song. It is thought to have been composed in 1916, shortly before Romania's entry into World War I, although its first historical apparition occurred in February 1919, when members of the Romanian Legion of Transylvanian–Bukovinian Volunteers were recorded singing a version of the song. The original version (with 3 stanzas) is about how Romanian soldiers say goodbye to their families and go to Transylvania to fight against the Austro-Hungarian Empire for the unification of the region with the Kingdom of Romania.

The song was later "revived" in the 1970s and 1980s, when Adrian Păunescu and other poets added more stanzas and made the song part of the repertory of the spectacles of Cenaclul Flacăra, an artistic and cultural movement of the time. This ended up making the song more popular during the communist period.

There is a theory that the author was possibly , who composed around 30 other choirs and fanfares about Transylvania and Banat during the interwar period. However, he was only 12 in the year 1916, making it unlikely if the song was indeed composed at that time.

This song is similar to "" ("Gray uniformed infantry"), a Polish patriotic song reportedly from either 1918 or 1927.

Lyrics
The lyrics are as follows:

Original version (World War I)

Cenaclul Flacăra version (1970s–1980s)

References

External links

Romanian patriotic songs
1916 songs
Songs of World War I
Romanian military marches
Romanian-language songs